Shian is a village in Kurdistan Province, Iran.

Shian or Shiyan or Sheyan may also refer to:
Shian, Isfahan
Shian, alternate name of Shuhan-e Sofla, Kermanshah
Qaleh-ye Shian, Kermanshah Province
Shian, Salas-e Babajani, Kermanshah Province
Shiyan Rural District, in Kermanshah Province